The Estadio Socios Fundadores is an indoor arena in Comodoro Rivadavia, Argentina which was opened in 1985. It is primarily used for basketball and is the home arena of Gimnasia y Esgrima de Comodoro Rivadavia. It holds 1,900 people.

In 2015 it hosted the South American qualification for the FIVB Volleyball Women's World Cup.

References

Socios Fundadores